, stylized as CARRY LOOSE, was a Japanese alternative idol girl group active from September 2019 to October 2020. They released their debut album, Carry Loose, on October 22, 2019.

History
On June 19, 2019, it was announced that former Bis members Pan Luna Leafy and Yuina Empire and Wagg trainee Uruu Ru and would form a new group. The group was given the temporary name Curry Rouxz and auditions were held for more members. On September 4, the group's name was finalised as Carry Loose, and a new member, Yumeka Nowkana?, was added. The group's eponymous debut album was released on October 22.

The group's first single, "Ningen", was released on February 11, 2020. From July 20, they broadcast a 24-hour livestream, titled "Carry of Major", which would continue until they achieved a major label debut. On October 16, after almost three months of livestreaming, it was announced that the group had not achieved a major debut and that they would disband on October 31, 2020. Carry Loose disbanded as planned on October 31, with the release of their second and final single "Colors".

Members

Yuina Empire

Discography

Studio albums

Singles

References

External links
Official website

Japanese girl groups
Japanese idol groups
Japanese pop music groups
Musical groups from Tokyo
Musical groups established in 2019
2019 establishments in Japan
Musical groups disestablished in 2020
2020 disestablishments in Japan